Dejan Govedarica (born 2 October 1969) is a Serbian former professional footballer who played as a midfielder.

Club career
Govedarica played three seasons for Proleter Zrenjanin between 1989 and 1992, before switching to Vojvodina. He then spent three and half years in Novi Sad, making 102 appearances and scoring 23 goals in the top flight.

In the 1996 winter transfer window, Govedarica moved abroad and joined Dutch club Volendam. He was transferred to Serie A side Lecce in 1997, but was unable to help them avoid relegation.

After one season in Italy, Govedarica moved back to the Netherlands and signed with RKC Waalwijk, spending the next four seasons with the club. He was subsequently signed by NEC Nijmegen on a two-year contract. In 2004, Govedarica returned to Vojvodina.

International career
At international level, Govedarica was capped 29 times and scored two goals for FR Yugoslavia from 1994 to 2000. He participated at the 1998 FIFA World Cup and UEFA Euro 2000.

Managerial career
After hanging up his boots, Govedarica started his managerial career as an assistant to Miroslav Đukić with the Serbia national under-21 football team, finishing as runners-up in the 2007 UEFA European Under-21 Championship.

Career statistics

References

External links
 
 
 

1969 births
Living people
Sportspeople from Zrenjanin
Yugoslav footballers
Serbia and Montenegro footballers
Serbian footballers
Association football midfielders
Serbia and Montenegro international footballers
1998 FIFA World Cup players
UEFA Euro 2000 players
FK Proleter Zrenjanin players
FK Vojvodina players
FC Volendam players
U.S. Lecce players
RKC Waalwijk players
NEC Nijmegen players
Yugoslav Second League players
Yugoslav First League players
First League of Serbia and Montenegro players
Eredivisie players
Serie A players
Serbia and Montenegro expatriate footballers
Expatriate footballers in the Netherlands
Expatriate footballers in Italy
Serbia and Montenegro expatriate sportspeople in the Netherlands
Serbia and Montenegro expatriate sportspeople in Italy
Serbian football managers
Guangzhou City F.C. non-playing staff
Serbian expatriate football managers
Expatriate football managers in China
Serbian expatriate sportspeople in China